Modern Chivalry: Containing the Adventures of Captain John Farrago and Teague O'Regan, His servant is a rambling, satirical American novel by Hugh Henry Brackenridge, a Pittsburgh writer, lawyer, judge, and justice of the Pennsylvania Supreme Court. The book was first published in 1792.

The hero, Captain John Farrago, is a frontier Don Quixote who leaves his Western Pennsylvania farm on a whim, to "ride about the world a little, with his man Teague at his heels, to see how things were going on here and there, and to observe human nature".
 
The book is arguably the first important work of fiction about the American frontier and called "to the West what Don Quixote was to Europe". It first appeared in 1792 in two parts, and the third and fourth sections of the book appeared in 1793 and 1797, and a revision in 1805, with a final addition in 1815. Henry Adams called it "a more thoroughly American book than any written before 1833."

References

University of Virginia Library. University of Virginia Library: Hypertexts. Part I & Part II. Retrieved September 26, 2007.
University of Virginia Library. University of Virginia Library: Early American Fiction. Serialized edition. Retrieved September 26, 2007.

18th-century American novels
Novels set in Pennsylvania
American satirical novels